Kaulikura is a small village in Unakoti, Tripura, India.
 
Villages in Unakoti district